Professor Radha Krishna Choudhary (15 February 1921 – 15 March 1985) was an Indian historian, thinker, and writer. He contributed to the historical and archaeological studies of Bihar as well as to Maithili literature. He published numerous original researches on the history of Bihar and was acclaimed as a researcher. He was a professor at Ganesh Dutt College, Begusarai, Bihar and was a noted educationist. His languages of choice for academic works were Hindi and English, and for literary work was Maithili.

Major works
 Political History of Japan (1868–1947). Bihar Publishers, Patna. 1948. English.
 Maithili Sahityik Nibandhavali. Abhinav Granthagar, Patna. 1950. Maithili.
 Sidhharth. Abhinav Granthagar, Patna. 2 ed. 1952. Hindi.
 Studies in Ancient Indian Law. Motilal Banarsidas, Patna.1953. English.
 Bihar - The Homeland of Buddhism. Sidharth Press, Patna. 1956. English.
 History of Bihar. Motilal Banarsidas, Patna. 1958. English.
 Select Inscriptions of Bihar. Smt Shanti Devi. 1958. English.
 Mithilak Sankshipt Rajnaitik Itihas. Vaidehi Samiti, Darbhanga. 1961. Maithili.
 Vratyas in Ancient India. Choukhamba Prakashan, Varanasi. 1964. English.
 Prachin Bharat Ka Rajnaitik Evam Sanskritik Itihas (1200 Eisvi Tak). Bharati Bhavan Publishers, Patna. 1967. Hindi.
 Sharaantidha. Maithili Prakashan, Calcutta. 1968. Maithili.
 Vishva Itihas Ki Ruprekha (2 Volumes). Ajanta Press Patna. 1969. Hindi.
 History of Muslim Rule in Tirhut (1207 - 1765). Choukhamba Prakashan, Varanasi. 1970. English.
 Kautilya's Political Ideas and Institutions. Choukhamba Prakashan, Varanasi. 1971. English.
 Dhammapada - Maithili Translation. Maithii Prakashan Samiti, Calcutta. 1971. Maithili
 A Survey of Maithili Literature, Shruti Publications, Delhi, 2010, ISBN No.978-93-80538-36-5
 Mithilak Itihas, Shruti Publication, Delhi, 2010 (in Maithili Language), ISBN No.978-93-80538-28-0

Biography

External links
A select list of books on Bihar
JSTOR entry of  Radha Krishna Choudhary
Numismatic References
Famous Books of Mithila
Bibliography of Indian history up to 1750
 Google Books entry of Peasants in Indian History: Theoretical Issues and Structural Enquiries
Google Books entry of The University of Vikramshila
Google Books entry of Peasants in Indian History
Google Books entry of Mahakavi Laldas
Google Books entry of Mithila under the Karnatas
Google books entry of Some Aspects of Social and Economic History of Ancient India and Cambodia
Google books entry of Mithila in the age of Vidyapati

Maithili literature
Writers of Mithila
People from Begusarai
1921 births
1985 deaths
Historians of India
20th-century Indian historians